The Minor Seminary of Our Lady of Fatima is a Roman Catholic seminary, located in Dare, Dili, East Timor. Established in 1936, it is the oldest Roman Catholic seminary in East Timor. The seminary was initially established in Manatutu district, south of Dili. In 1951 it was moved to Dare. In 1954 the Vatican canonically registered the seminary. It was taken over by the Jesuits in 1958.

History
The seminary, which sits on the top ridge of the mountains surrounding Dili, was for generations East Timor's most important educational institute where almost every East Timorese leader was educated.

In 1983 the St. Joseph's High School became a separate institution from the Minor Seminary. Among the students of the High School are approximately 50 seminarians.

The seminary was the only place where East Timorese could be educated beyond secondary school level and its alumni include a roll call of leaders including Nicolau dos Reis Lobato and Carlos Filipe Ximenes Belo. Xanana Gusmão spent four years at the seminary. Most of the Fretilin guerillas were educated at the Seminary including Jose Ramos Horta.

Until independence the medium of instruction was Bahasa Indonesia.

In July 2000 the seminary was the venue for the marriage of East Timor President Xanana Gusmão and Kirsty Sword. In 2001 the seminary had about 30 Timorese candidates for the diocesan priesthood. In 2017 the seminary had 254 students. On 1 March 2007 the country's new Apostolic Nuncio, Archbishop Leopoldo Girelli, celebrated Mass at the Immaculate Conception Cathedral, Dili before visiting the Seminary.

Father Lopes Mouzinho is the Rector of the Seminary in 2007. The grounds of the Seminary are still a sanctuary for thousands of refugees. It has become one of Dili's many Internally Displaced Persons Camps.

Current operations 
By 2010, being the country's only minor seminary, it was struggling to accommodate the growing number of candidates desiring to enter the priesthood. This led to the plan to build a second minor seminary. In 2017, the Maliana Diocese became home to the St. Joseph Seminary, Maliana, the country's second minor seminary.

In 2016, Father Angelo Salsinha was rector of the seminary. Speaking at the Seminary on 8 March 2016,  Msgr. Ionut Paul Strejac, the Vatican's chargé d'affaires in Timor-Leste, spoke to about 400 Timor-Leste youth mostly university and high school students in Dili Diocese about reconciliation, conflict and violence.

Milestones
The alumni of the seminary, including President Xanana Gusmão, Bishop Alberto Ricardo da Silva of Dili and Bishop Basilio do Nascimento of Baucau, and others met at the Seminary on 30 October 2004 to celebrate its 50th anniversary. Jesuit Father Leonardus Dibyawiyata who was the rector of the seminary from 1996 to 1999 also spoke on the occasion. The seminary has produced about 40 priests, including three Bishops. Hundreds of politicians and professionals also are graduates of the seminary.

In 2010 the Church in East Timor celebrated the 75th anniversary of the opening of the Seminary, where 75 seminarians were preparing for the priesthood.

References

East Timor
Catholic Church in East Timor
Educational institutions established in 1936
1936 establishments in the Portuguese Empire